The 1935–36 season was Newport County fourth consecutive season in the Third Division South and their 15th in the Football League. County finished in the re-election places for the second consecutive season, but as with the previous season, were comfortably re-elected.

Season review

Results summary

Results by round

Fixtures and results

Third Division South

FA Cup

Third Division South Cup

Welsh Cup

League table

Election

External links
 Newport County 1935-1936 : Results
 Newport County football club match record: 1936
 Welsh Cup 1935/36

References

 Amber in the Blood: A History of Newport County. 

1935-36
English football clubs 1935–36 season
1935–36 in Welsh football